Daniel John Hay (born 15 May 1975) is a retired New Zealand professional footballer who is currently the manager of the New Zealand national football team,  New Zealand U-23, and New Zealand U-20. Hay played as a central defender for Premier League club Leeds United and National Soccer League side, Perth Glory.  He also captained Waitakere United in the New Zealand Football Championship.

Early and personal life
Hay was born in Auckland and grew up in Titirangi and later Hillsborough. He attended Kelston Boys High School where he played in the 1st XI for four years between 1990–1993.

High school career

Kelston Boys High School
Hay made the Auckland Secondary Schools U-17 side in 1990 and the following year was a member of the Kelston 1st XI that won the National Secondary School football championship. In 1992 Kelston won the Auckland Secondary School and Knockout Competition and were the only unbeaten team at the National Tournament before it was abandoned due to bad weather.

In 1993 Hay captained Kelston who lost the National Tournament final to Auckland Grammar 1–0. Hay was selected in the national tournament team and named player of the tournament. He was selected for the Auckland Secondary Schools team (which he also captained) and the Auckland U-19 team.

Hay was awarded the Auckland College Sportsperson of the Year (Football) for 1993.

Club career

Waitakere City
Hay played for Waitakere City in 1994 and was named in the starting line up as an injury replacement for Rodger Gray in the Chatham Cup final against Wellington Olympic which was won 1–0. Hay was also a member of the successful Waitakere City team that ended up winning the 1995 New Zealand Superclub League competition beating Waikato United 4–0 in the final. Waitakere repeated their Chatham Cup success beating North Shore United in the 1995 final 4–0.

Central United
Hay moved to Central United for the National Summer League which commenced in January 1996. On 30 March he captained the side to their away win over Waitakere City 2–0 and contributed with a penalty goal.

Perth Glory
In August 1997, Hay signed for Perth Glory in only their second season in the Australian National Soccer League. Hay scored a goal in their 4–1 win over eventual season championship winners South Melbourne at Perth Oval on 7 December 1997. Perth Glory finished 8th on the table at the end of the season. Hay was awarded the prestigious Perth Glory Most Glorious Player award.

The following season proved to be more successful for Perth Glory finishing 3rd after losing the preliminary final to Sydney United at Sydney on 23 May 1999. Hay was awarded again the prestigious Perth Glory Most Glorious Player award this time jointly with Scott Miller.

Leeds United
In June 1999, Hay trialled for Bundesliga side VfB Stuttgart before trialling the following month for FA Premier League side, Leeds United on the first team's pre season tour of Sweden and Finland.  On 14 July 1999, Hay started in their friendly match against Swedish side Byske IF. On 17 July 1999, he started again and played the full fixture against Finnish side Tervaritahdet in Oulu. Hay was rested for the final match against Swedish side Bodens BK. Due to trial commitments Hay was unavailable for international duties at the Confederations Cup in Mexico.

Hay was successful in obtaining a three-year contract with Leeds and became the first New Zealander to be offered a contract by a Premier League club. Hay was initially included in Leeds' Reserve squad for the 1999—2000 Premier Reserve League season where he started in the majority of the 24 fixtures between August 1999 and May 2000.

Hay's time at Leeds was marked by injuries and all his appearances for the club's first team featured in less than a two-month period from when he debuted for the team in the UEFA Champions League. His time with the team was mainly on the bench when the team itself was ravaged by injuries.

On 30 September 1999, Hay was named on the bench for Leeds' second leg UEFA Cup first round fixture against Partizan Belgrade at Elland Road.

UEFA Champions League
On 13 September 2000, Hay was named on the bench for their UEFA Champions League first group stage fixture against FC Barcelona at the Nou Camp. Hay came on in the 89th minute as a substitute for captain Lucas Radebe who suffered what appeared to be a serious neck injury. Hay's appearance as a replacement albeit brief was the first appearance by a New Zealander in the UEFA Champions League since Oceania Footballer of the Century, New Zealand International and Werder Bremen striker, Wynton Rufer.

After making an appearance in the game against Barcelona, Hay was named on the bench but didn't see the field again for Leeds in games against AC Milan, Beşiktaş J.K twice and the home fixture against Barcelona

On 8 November 2000, Hay was again a substitute for the return leg away fixture against AC Milan which was drawn 1–1. The point gained, qualified Leeds to join group leaders AC Milan through to the last 16 of the Champions League.

A hernia operation curtailed Hay's further involvement until he made a return for the Reserves team against Liverpool in January 2001.  On 14 March 2001, Hay returned to the bench for the first team for the return leg fixture against Lazio at home which was drawn 3–3 and advanced Leeds into the quarter-final stage.

FA Premier League
On 30 September 2000, Hay made his first appearance when he came on as a 45th-minute substitute for Lucas Radebe in Leeds United's 4–3 win over Tottenham Hotspur at Elland Road. Hay became only the second New Zealander after Lee Norfolk to appear in England's top division.

On 21 October 2000, Hay started in Leeds United's away fixture against Manchester United at Old Trafford which was lost 0–3. The following week Hay started in their fixture against Bradford City at Valley Parade where his headed attempt on goal was cleared from the line by Bradford defender Ian Nolan in the 12th minute. On 4 November 2000, Hay came on as a 16th-minute substitute for Jonathan Woodgate against Liverpool in a memorable 4–3 victory for Leeds.

Football League Cup
On 31 October 2000, Hay started for Leeds in their third round fixture in the Worthington Cup against Tranmere Rovers at Prenton Park which was lost 2–3 after extra time.

Hay had surgery in the summer and returned for pre-season fixtures in August. On 8 August 2001, he started in the pre-season away fixture against York City which was won 4–0.  On 13 August 2001, he started in the pre-season away fixture against Harrowgate Town which was won by Leeds 3–0. On 22 August 2001, Hay started in the away fixture against Selby Town FC but he aggravated a groin injury and needed further treatment. Hay still had injury worries later in the season precluding him from Leeds' first leg third round UEFA Cup away fixture against Grasshoppers Zürich on 22 November 2001. Hay made no further first team or reserve squad appearances in the season due to injury.

Walsall
Hay was released at the end of his Leeds United contract in May 2002 and later signed for Walsall FC in July 2002 who were playing Football League First Division in England. Hay became a regular starter for the team, having forty starts and five games off the bench for Walsall.

Football Kingz
Hay signed on with the Football Kingz in what turned out to be the club's last season. Hay joined the squad in the early part of 2004 making seven appearances and played his last match against Brisbane on 29 February 2004 where he scored a goal.

New Zealand Knights
Hay started the 2005–2006 season as inaugural captain for the Auckland-based New Zealand Knights, but left the club in December 2005 following a falling out with management.

Perth Glory
Hay swapped clubs during the 2005–06 A-League season to rivals Perth Glory, joining his former club in January 2006 after an SOS to help them out due to injuries.

Waitakere United
Hay then returned to New Zealand to see out the rest of his playing career with Waitakere United who played in the New Zealand Football Championship. Hay was captain of the team during the 2006–07 season where they were runners up to Auckland City in the grand final. Hay continued as captained the next season, helping lead the team to their maiden title with a win over Team Wellington in the 2007–08 season grand final. The 2008–09 season, Waitakere again where runners up to Auckland City losing in a dramatic grand final 2–1.

International career
Hay played in the New Zealand national team, making 31 appearances for the team and scoring two goals. Hay made his New Zealand debut against Oman on 29 September 1996 during New Zealand's tour of Oman, Saudi Arabia, Qatar and Lebanon. His first goal for his country came against Fiji in the 1998 Oceania Nations Cup in a 1–0 win. In 2006, Hay was awarded the captaincy of the New Zealand team.

2003 FIFA Confederation Cup – France

After not playing any international football for four years, Hay was named in the New Zealand squad who were grouped with France, Colombia and Japan in Group A. Hay was recovering from an ankle injury which had ended his season in mid February while at Walsall FC.

On 18 June 2003, Hay was an unused substitute in the All Whites opening match against Japan at Saint-Denis which was lost 0–3. On 20 June 2003, Hay started in New Zealand's next match against Colombia at Lyon which was lost 1–3.  On 22 June 2003, Hay played in the team's final fixture against a French side at Saint-Denis which the New Zealanders lost 0–5.

At the start of 2009, Hay retired from international football to pursue a teaching career at Sacred Heart College in Auckland. While teaching at the school, he was also involved with coaching the First XI and youth development teams.

Managerial career

Sacred Heart College
Hay was head coach of the 1st XI at Sacred Heart College. Hay lead Sacred Heart to win the Lotto Premier National Secondary Schools Championship for the years 2011, 2014 and 2016. In 2015, they were runners up to Nelson College 2–1 in the final. and to Hamilton Boys High in the 2017 final.

In May 2017, Hay lead the team to attend the International School Sport Federation's World Schools Championship in Prague.

New Zealand U-19 Secondary Schools

Hay was head coach for the National U-19 Secondary Schools side on their successful five match tour to the United Kingdom and the Republic of Ireland in April - May 2013.

Eastern Suburbs
Hay coached at Eastern Suburbs team in the ISPS Handa Premiership, leading the team to their first national title in 48 years when they won the Championship in 2019.

New Zealand under-17
Hay was appointed as coach of the New Zealand under-17 national team in April 2015. He was manager of the U17s at the 2015 FIFA U-17 World Cup where they lost to Brazil in the round of 16 due to a 96th-minute penalty having qualified from the group in second-place behind France. They started the tournament with a 1–6 lost to France before following it up with a 0–0 draw against Syria and a 2–1 win against Paraguay in group play.

In February 2017, the team won the 2017 OFC U-17 Championship with a 7–0 win over New Caledonia in the final, it was the biggest win over New Caledonia at this age group and also qualified the team for the 2017 FIFA U-17 World Cup. They went through the tournament undefeated, finishing top of their group while scoring 27 goals and only conceding one in the semi-final win over Papua New Guinea. It was also the New Zealand under-17 teams sixth consecutive OFC U-17 Championship and seventh overall.

New Zealand national team
On 26 August 2019, Hay was announced as the new coach of New Zealand, becoming only the second person to both captain and manage the team. In Hay's first game in charge, New Zealand lost 1–3 playing a friendly against the Republic of Ireland.

Controversy
Hay, then a teacher and coach at Sacred Heart College, Auckland, courted controversy in June 2012 by criticising New Zealand coach Ricki Herbert's tactics following a defeat in the 2012 OFC Nations Cup to the Solomon Islands. Hay was quoted as saying "It's a little bit scary that you've got one person dictating all the ideas and there's nothing fresh coming through. He's got tactically lazy and to play three at the back in Honiara was horrific in those conditions, with the type of players we had available to us."

Also while coaching at Sacred Heart, Hay was banned for four games after a sideline outburst at match officials, calling the referee and the assistant referee "f***ing cheats". Hay later stated that he regretted his actions and apologised to his players and parents of young children, who might have heard his outburst. During his playing career, Hay had never been sent off for abusing a match official.

References

External links

New Zealand national team coaching record on Ultimatenzsoccer.com
UK playing record on Ultimatenzsoccer.com

1975 births
Living people
New Zealand association footballers
New Zealand international footballers
New Zealand expatriate association footballers
Premier League players
English Football League players
A-League Men players
National Soccer League (Australia) players
Football Kingz F.C. players
Leeds United F.C. players
New Zealand Knights FC players
Perth Glory FC players
Waitakere United players
Walsall F.C. players
Central United F.C. players
Waitakere City FC players
Expatriate footballers in England
New Zealand expatriate sportspeople in England
New Zealand expatriate sportspeople in Australia
Australian people of New Zealand descent
1998 OFC Nations Cup players
2003 FIFA Confederations Cup players
Association football defenders
Association footballers from Auckland
New Zealand Football Championship players